Oleh Anatoliyovych Synyohub (born 19 April 1989) is a Ukrainian professional footballer who plays as a midfielder for LNZ Cherkasy.

He is product of several youth clubs from Kyiv and Donetsk. Synyohub made his debut at senior level for FC Dnipro Cherkasy at the Ukrainian First League in 2008. He joined FC Inhulets Petrove in 2017 after leaving FC Cherkaskyi Dnipro.

On 12 July 2022, he moved to LNZ Cherkasy.

References

External links
 
 
 

1989 births
Living people
Serhiy Bubka College of Olympic Reserve alumni
People from Cherkasy Oblast
Ukrainian footballers
Association football midfielders
FC Dnipro Cherkasy players
FC Arsenal-Kyivshchyna Bila Tserkva players
FC Yednist Plysky players
FC Poltava players
FC Karlivka players
FC Cherkashchyna players
FC Inhulets Petrove players
FC Inhulets-2 Petrove players
FC Mynai players
FC LNZ Cherkasy players
Ukrainian Premier League players
Ukrainian First League players
Ukrainian Second League players
Sportspeople from Cherkasy Oblast